δ-Cadinol is an organic compound, a sesquiterpenoid alcohol produced by many plants as well as some animals and microorganisms.  It is a white crystalline solid, soluble in isopropyl ether and ethanol. It is an epimer of α-cadinol.

δ-Cadinol exists in nature as either of two enantiomers distinguished by the prefixes (+)- and (−)-. The (+)-isomer was identified by E. Shinozaki in 1922 from the leaves of Torreya nucifera and originally named torreyol.  The (−)-isomer was isolated in 1951 by Haagen-Smit and others from Pinus albicaulus and first called albicaulol. Its structure was determined in 1970 by Lars Westfelt. Other names were given to δ-cadinol based on its various biological sources before the structures were confirmed, including sesquigoyol for (+)-δ-cadinol and pilgerol for (−)-δ-cadinol. Lambertol is thought to be either (+)-δ-cadinol or (−)-δ-cadinol. Cedrelanol was originally thought to be identical to (−)-δ-cadinol but was later confirmed to have the structure of τ-cadinol.

Occurrence
δ-Cadinol is produced by the fungus Xylobolus frustulatus as long white needles when grown in malt agar medium. It also occurs in many conifers, and in many other organisms including
 Achillea millefolium (6%)
 Cedrela odorata
 Clitocybe illudens (a mushroom)
 Copaifera multijuga (1%; a major contributor to the aroma of copaiba oil)
 Dictyopteris divaricata (a brown alga)
 Plebejus argyrognomon (a butterfly; acts as a pheromone)

See also
 α-Cadinol
 τ-Cadinol

References

Sesquiterpenes